Zhengjiao Intercity Railway Yellow River Bridge is a four-track railway bridge in Henan, China, across the Yellow River. It carries the Beijing–Guangzhou railway and the Zhengzhou–Jiaozuo intercity railway.

History 
Construction on the bridge began in October 2010. It was built to carry the new Zhengzhou–Jiaozuo intercity railway and as a replacement for the Jiayingguan Yellow River Railway Bridge on the Beijing–Guangzhou railway, located between 110 and 190 metres upstream. On 16 May 2014, the bridge was opened for trains on the Beijing–Guangzhou railway. The Zhengzhou–Jiaozuo intercity railway opened on 26 June 2015.

Specification 

References 

Bridges over the Yellow River
Railway bridges in China
Bridges completed in 2014
Rail transport in Henan